Sabicea stenantha is a species of plant in the family Rubiaceae. It is endemic to Ecuador.

References

Flora of Ecuador
stenantha
Data deficient plants
Taxonomy articles created by Polbot